The Transportation Safety Board of Canada (TSB), officially the Canadian Transportation Accident Investigation and Safety Board is the agency of the Government of Canada responsible for advancing transportation safety in Canada. It is accountable to Parliament directly through the President of the King’s Privy Council and the Minister of Intergovernmental and Northern Affairs and Internal Trade. The independent agency investigates accidents and makes safety recommendations in four modes of transportation: aviation, rail, marine and pipelines.

Agency history
Prior to 1990, Transport Canada's Aircraft Accident Investigation Branch (1960–1984) and its successor the  Canadian Aviation Safety Board or CASB (1984–1990) were responsible for investigation of air incidents. Before 1990, investigations and actions were taken by Transport Canada and even after 1984 the findings from CASB were not binding for Transport Canada to respond to.

The TSB was created under the Canadian Transportation Accident Investigation and Safety Board Act, which was enacted on March 29, 1990. It was formed in response to a number of high-profile accidents, following which the Government of Canada identified the need for an independent, multi-modal investigation agency. The headquarters are located in Place du Centre in Gatineau, Quebec.

The provisions of the Canadian Transportation Accident Investigation and Safety Board Act were written to establish an independent relationship between the agency and the Government of Canada.

This agency's first major test came with the crash of Swissair Flight 111 on September 2, 1998, the largest single aviation accident on Canadian territory since the 1985 crash of Arrow Air Flight 1285. The TSB delivered its report on the accident on March 27, 2003, some 4½ years after the accident and at a cost of $57 million, making it the most complex and costly accident investigation in Canadian history to that date.

From 2005 to 2010, the TSB concluded a number of investigations into high-profile accidents, including:
 the crash of Air France Flight 358;
 the Cheakamus River derailment;
 the sinking of Queen of the North;
 the loss overboard of a crewmember of Picton Castle;
 the Burnaby pipeline rupture;
 the crash of Cougar Helicopters Flight 91;
 the sinking of Concordia.

To increase the uptake of its recommendations and address accident patterns, the TSB launched its Watchlist in 2010, which points to nine critical safety issues troubling Canada’s transportation system.

On 3 December 2013, in the wake of the Lac-Mégantic rail disaster the previous July, it was reported that the number of runaway trains was triple the number documented by the TSB.

In August 2014, the TSB released the report on its investigation into the July 2013 Lac-Mégantic derailment. In a news conference, then TSB chair Wendy Tadros described how eighteen factors played a role in the disaster including a "weak safety culture" at the now-defunct Montreal, Maine & Atlantic Railways with "a lack of standards, poor training and easily punctured tanks." The TSB also blamed Transport Canada, the regulator, for not doing thorough safety audits often enough on railways "to know how those companies were really managing, or not managing, risk." The TSB report called for "physical restraints, such as wheel chocks, for parked trains." Prior to the accident TSB had called for "new and more robust wagons for flammable liquids" but as of August 2014, little progress had been made in implementing this.

On February 4, 2019, the TSB deployed  to the derailment of Canadian Pacific Railway (CP) train 301-349. Ninety-nine cars and two locomotives derailed at Mile 130.6 of the CP Laggan Subdivision, near Field, British Columbia (BC) while proceeding westward to Vancouver, BC. The three train crewmembers – a locomotive engineer, a conductor, and a conductor trainee – died as a result.

During the course of its investigation into the derailment, the organization issued two safety advisories on April 11, 2019 to Transport Canada . The first called attention to the need for effective safety procedures to be applied to all trains stopped in emergency on both “heavy grades” and “mountain grades”  and the second highlighted the need to review the efficacy of the inspection and maintenance procedures for grain hopper cars used in CP's unit grain train operations (and for other railways as applicable), and ensure that these cars can be operated safely at all times.

In January 2020, the Senior Investigator was reassigned in order to protect the integrity and objectivity of the investigation after voicing an opinion implying civil or criminal liability. The TSB labelled the comments made to The Fifth Estate journalists as "completely inappropriate" as the mandate of the TSB is to make findings as to causes and contributing factors of a transportation occurrence, but not to assign fault or determine civil or criminal liability. The CBC documentary pointed out what seemed to be a problem, where the private police service of CP Rail investigated the accident. A CPPS officer was also resigned over these circumstances. As of June 2020, the investigation is ongoing.

Mandate and direction
The Transportation Safety Board's mandate is to
 conduct independent investigations, including public inquiries when necessary, into selected transportation occurrences in order to make findings as to their causes and contributing factors;
 identify safety deficiencies, as evidenced by transportation occurrences;
 make recommendations designed to eliminate or reduce any such safety deficiencies; and
 report publicly on its investigations and on the related findings

The TSB may assist other transportation safety boards in their investigations. This may happen when:
 an incident or accident occurs involving a Canadian-registered aircraft in commercial or air transport use;
 an incident or accident occurs involving a Canadian-built aircraft (or an aircraft with Canadian-built engines, propellers, or other vital components) in commercial or air transport use;
 a country without the technical ability to conduct a full investigation asks for the TSB's assistance (especially in the field of reading and analyzing the content of flight recorders).

Provincial and territorial governments may call upon the TSB to investigate occurrences. However, it is up to the TSB whether or not to proceed with an investigation. Public reports are published following class one, class two, class three and class four investigations. Recommendations made by the TSB are not legally binding upon the Government of Canada, nor any of its Ministers of departments. However, when a recommendation is made to a federal department, a formal response must be presented to the TSB within 90 days.

The TSB reports to the Parliament of Canada through the President of the Queen's Privy Council for Canada.

Board membership
As of February 2020, the Board was composed of the following five members:
 Chair Kathy Fox
 Faye Ackermans
 Ken Potter
 Joseph Hincke
 Paul Dittmann

Facilities
The TSB Engineering Laboratory, which has the facilities for investigating transport accidents and incidents, is in Ottawa, adjacent to Ottawa International Airport.

List of chairs
 John W. Stants 1990–1996
 Benoît Bouchard 1996–2001
 Camille Thériault 2001–2002
 Charles H. Simpson 2002–2005 (acting)
 Wendy A. Tadros 2005–2006 (acting)
 Wendy A. Tadros 2006–2014
 Kathleen Fox 2014–present

See also

Aviation safety

References

External links
  

Rail accident investigators
Organizations investigating aviation accidents and incidents
Aviation authorities
Transport safety organizations
Federal departments and agencies of Canada
Aviation in Canada
1990 establishments in Quebec
History of transport in Canada
Railway safety
Organizations based in Gatineau
Transport organizations based in Canada
Canadian transport law